Devin Saddle (Devinska Sedlovina \'de-vin-ska se-dlo-vi-'na\) is a saddle of 500 m in the Tangra Mountains, Livingston Island located between Levski Ridge to the west and Delchev Ridge to the east. It is part of the divide between the glacial catchments of Iskar Glacier to the north and Magura Glacier to the south. It is named after the Bulgarian town of Devin. Devin (Bulgarian: Девин [ˈdɛvin]) is a spa town in Smolyan Province in the far south of Bulgaria.

Location

Maps
 L.L. Ivanov et al. Antarctica: Livingston Island and Greenwich Island, South Shetland Islands. Scale 1:100000 topographic map. Sofia: Antarctic Place-names Commission of Bulgaria, 2005.
 L.L. Ivanov. Antarctica: Livingston Island and Greenwich, Robert, Snow and Smith Islands. Scale 1:120000 topographic map.  Troyan: Manfred Wörner Foundation, 2009.

External links
 Devin Saddle. SCAR Composite Antarctic Gazetteer
 Bulgarian Antarctic Gazetteer. Antarctic Place-names Commission. (details in Bulgarian, basic data in English)

External links
 Devin Saddle. Copernix satellite image

Tangra Mountains